Mark Philippoussis was the defending champion, but did not participate.Fabrice Santoro defeated Nicolas Mahut in the final 6–4, 6–4.

The event saw first seed Mardy Fish being knocked out of the first round by qualifier Aisam-ul-Haq Qureshi, continuing the tradition of the first seeds never winning the Newport event. Fish had once knocked out the first seed when he was a qualifier.

Seeds

Draw

Finals

Top half

Bottom half

References
 Single Draw
 Qualifying Draw

Singles